Olivia in Concert is a 1983 home video release of a concert by singer Olivia Newton-John. The concert was taped at Dee Events Center, Weber State University in Ogden, Utah on October 12 and 13, 1982, during Olivia's Physical Tour. It originally premiered as a television special on HBO on January 23, 1983. The video charted at No. 15 on Billboard Top Videodisks and was certified gold by the Recording Industry Association of America for shipment of 50,000 units in the United States. The video album was nominated for a Grammy as Best Video Album in 1983.

Track listing
"Deeper Than the Night"
"Let Me Be There"
"Please Mr. Please"
"If You Love Me, Let Me Know"
"Jolene"
"Sam"
"Xanadu"
"Magic"
"Suddenly"
"A Little More Love"
"Silvery Rain"
"Falling"
"Heart Attack"
"Make a Move on Me"
"Hopelessly Devoted to You"
"You're the One That I Want"
"Physical"
"I Honestly Love You"

Weekly charts

Production
 Costume Design – Fleur Thiemeyer

References

Olivia Newton-John video albums
Live video albums
Olivia Newton-John live albums
1983 video albums
1983 live albums
HBO network specials
1983 television specials